Berlare is a municipality located in the Belgian province of East Flanders. The Donkmeer, a large lake and a regional tourist attraction, is located centrally in the municipality. In 2021, Berlare had a total population of 15,222.

History 

It was where the 1798 rebellion against French rule, known as the "Peasants' War" began in 1798.

Places of interest 
 The church of Saint Martin and a 17th-century pillory in the center of Berlare proper. The Castle of Berlare, also in the town centre, was opened to the public in 2012.
 The Bareldonk Chapel, built in the 14th century and expanded in 1774 in Rococo style, is situated in Donk. There is a Way of the Cross and calvary with sculptures by  next to the chapel.
 The Donkmeer is a lake, about 86 ha in size, that came into existence through the harvesting of peat.
 Recreation area Nieuwdonk.
 Forested areas with trails include Berlare Broek and the Gratiebossen.
 Riekend Rustpunt is a very small museum about the historic river transport of manure from the city to the countryside.

Gallery

Notable people 
 Tjörven De Brul, soccer player
 Fred De Bruyne, cyclist and TV commentator
 Karel De Gucht, politician
 Paul Cammermans, film director and actor
 Yves Van Der Straeten, soccer player
 Preben Van Hecke, cyclist
 , theater, opera, musical and TV director
 Cecile Bombeek, serial killer

References

External links 
 
  

 
Municipalities of East Flanders
Populated places in East Flanders